In geometry, a slab is a region between two parallel lines in the Euclidean plane, or between two parallel planes in three-dimensioal Euclidean space or between two hyperplanes in higher dimensions.

Set definition 
A slab can also be defined as a set of points:
 

Or, if the slab is centered around the origin:
 
where  is the thickness of the slab.

See also 
 Bounding slab
 Convex polytope
 Half-plane
 Hyperplane
 Prismatoid
 Slab decomposition
 Spherical shell

References 

Elementary geometry
Geometric shapes
Spherical geometry